The pratincoles or greywaders are a group of birds which together with the coursers make up the family Glareolidae. They have short legs, very long pointed wings and long forked tails.

Description
Their most unusual feature for birds classed as waders is that they typically hunt their insect prey on the wing like swallows, although they can also feed on the ground. Their short bills are an adaptation to aerial feeding.

Their flight is fast and graceful like a swallow or a tern, with many twists and turns to pursue their prey. They are most active at dawn and dusk, resting in the warmest part of the day.

Like the coursers, the pratincoles are found in warmer parts of the Old World, from southern Europe and Africa east through Asia to Australia. Species breeding in temperate regions are long-distance migrants.

Their two to four eggs are laid on the ground in a bare scrape.

The downy pratincole chicks are able to run as soon as they are hatched.

The Australian pratincole, the only species not in the genus Glareola, is more terrestrial than the other pratincoles, and may be intermediate between this group and the coursers.

The name "pratincole" comes from the term pratincola coined by German naturalist Wilhelm Heinrich Kramer from the Latin words prātum meadow and incola resident.

Species list
 Genus Stiltia
 Australian pratincole Stiltia isabella
 Genus Glareola
 Collared pratincole Glareola pratincola
 Oriental pratincole Glareola maldivarum
 Black-winged pratincole Glareola nordmanni
 Madagascar pratincole Glareola ocularis
 Rock pratincole Glareola nuchalis
 Grey pratincole Glareola cinerea
 Small pratincole Glareola lactea

References
 Shorebirds by Hayman, Marchant and Prater 

 Birds Korea - conserving birds and habitats in South Korea and the Yellow Sea eco-region

Glareolidae
Bird common names